Renishaw Central is a former railway station in Renishaw, Derbyshire, England.

From its opening the station was named Eckington and Renishaw, but it was renamed "Renishaw Central" in 1950 by British Railways to prevent confusion with the nearby ex-Midland Railway station, also called Eckington and Renishaw.

It had two platforms with wooden waiting rooms and canopies and a wooden ticket office on an overbridge at the southern end.

The station was the junction for a Great Central branch to Renishaw Ironworks. A Midland branch to the ironworks passed under the platforms. There was also a branch to Renishaw Park colliery.

Modern times
The station has been demolished, but the trackbed forms part of the Central Section of the Trans Pennine Trail.

References

Sources

Further reading

External links
Renishaw Central Subterranea Britannica
Renishaw Central Disused Stations
The station on an Edwardian 25" OS map, with overlays National Library of Scotland
The station and line on multiple maps with overlays Rail Map Online
The station on a navigable 1955 OS map npe Maps
The station on line BEI Railway Codes
Looking south from the station overbridge, the station is behind the camera RCTS
Looking north with the station to the left, the line curving right led to the ironworks RCTS
Looking north from the road overbridge RCTS
Looking north after closure as a through route. The unsevered track served Arkwright Colliery RCTS
Looking north eastwards from the road RCTS

Disused railway stations in Derbyshire
Railway stations in Great Britain opened in 1892
Railway stations in Great Britain closed in 1963
Former Great Central Railway stations